Norantea brasiliensis is a species of flowering plant in the Marcgraviaceae family. It is a vine native to Brazil.

References

MCB Pinheiro, WT Ormond, HA De Lima, MCR Correia, (1995) Biology of reproduction of Norantea brasiliensis Choisy(Marcgraviaceae), Revista Brasileira de Biologia. Vol. 55, no. suppl. 1.

Marcgraviaceae
Flora of Brazil